The Frankford Branch was a railway line located in the city of Philadelphia, in the United States. Its opening in 1894 provided residents of the Frankford neighborhood with direct access to Reading Terminal. It was part of the Reading system until its 1976 conveyance to Conrail. Conrail abandoned the branch in the 1990s.

History 
The branch was constructed between 1892–1894 by the Philadelphia and Frankford Railroad, a subsidiary of the Philadelphia and Reading Railroad and forerunner of the Reading Company. The line branched off from the Reading's Newtown Branch at Frankford Junction, east of Olney. The ceremonial opening of the line took place on June 29, 1894, with scheduled services beginning on July 2.

The line's original terminus was Frankford station, located near the intersection of Frankford Avenue and Unity Street. The Frankford extension of the Market–Frankford Line, which opened in 1922, led to the Reading closing this station in 1928. The Philadelphia and Frankford Railroad was one of twelve Reading properties merged at the end of 1923 to create the new Reading Company. The Frankford Branch was one of many Reading lines conveyed to Conrail in 1976 as a result of the Reading's bankruptcy. Conrail abandoned the line in the mid-1990s, prior to the CSX Transportation / Norfolk Southern Railway acquisition.

Notes

References 

Railway lines opened in 1894
Rail infrastructure in Pennsylvania
Reading Company lines